Brigadier Helm Roos (1930–1992) was a senior officer in the South African Army from the artillery . He was a qualified Army Air Observation Pilot who served as OC 7 South African Division and Western Province Command before his retirement in the seventies.

Army career 
He served as an artilleryman in 4 Field Training Regiment and 14 Field Regiment. As a major, he completed the British Army Command and Staff course in the fifties. He was in command of the management team in Angola during the "Bridge 14" operation circa 1974 during the cold-war era power vacuum left by the Portuguese evacuation. He later commanded 14 Fd Regt and was appointed as the Military Attaché in Portugal and OC WP Cmnd. He was an Honorary Colonel of The Cape Town Rifles (Dukes) between 1991 and 1992.

Awards and decorations

Post Army career 
He was recruited by the Royal Dutch Shell Oil company at retirement from the Army to the position of Chief of Security South Africa, where he served the remainder of his life espousing the principle of "being the harder nut to crack".  He succumbed to prostate cancer in Two Military hospital in 1992.

References

South African generals
1930 births
1992 deaths
Military attachés
Afrikaner people
South African people of Dutch descent
South African military personnel of the Border War